Sphenophryne miniafia is a species of frog in the family Microhylidae. It is endemic to Papua New Guinea. Its natural habitat is mid montane wet forest.

Description

Juveniles of this species have relatively longer snout, larger eyes, and broader heads than adults.

References

Sphenophryne
Amphibians of Papua New Guinea
Endemic fauna of Papua New Guinea
Amphibians described in 2014